YCC may refer to:

 National Young Composers Challenge
 Volvo YCC, a concept car from Volvo
 YCbCr a family of colour spaces used in video systems
 YCC, the IATA code for Cornwall Regional Airport
 Y Chromosome Consortium, a geneticist team who work to standardize classification for human Y-DNA
 Yorkshire Coast College a further education college located over three sites in Scarborough, North Yorkshire, England
 Young Comrades Club, founded 1927, the youth wing of the Communist Party of Australia
 Young Critics Circle, an award-giving body for cinema in the Philippines
 Youth Conservation Corps, a youth program of the U.S. National Park Service providing jobs and environmental education